Humberto J. Cortina (born August 7, 1941) was an American politician in the state of Florida.

Cortina was born in Cuba and came to the United States in 1960. He is a veteran of the Bay of Pigs Invasion. He served in the Florida House of Representatives from 1982 to 1984 (113th district).

References

1941 births
Living people
Republican Party members of the Florida House of Representatives
People from Havana
Politicians from Miami
Cuban emigrants to the United States
American politicians of Cuban descent
20th-century American politicians
Hispanic and Latino American state legislators in Florida